Willy Krauß (born 10 February 1886, date of death unknown) was a German international footballer.

References

1886 births
Year of death missing
Association football midfielders
German footballers
Germany international footballers
FC Carl Zeiss Jena players